Trumpington Meadows Country Park is a 58 hectare nature reserve in Trumpington in Cambridgeshire. It is managed by the Wildlife Trust for Bedfordshire, Cambridgeshire and Northamptonshire.

This site has flower meadows, woodland, ponds, and is adjacent to the River Cam and Byron's Pool, where Lord Byron once swam. Fauna include otters, brown hares, muntjac deer, skylarks, lapwings, yellowhammers and meadow pipits.

There is access from Grantchester Road.

References

Wildlife Trust for Bedfordshire, Cambridgeshire and Northamptonshire reserves
Meadows in Cambridgeshire